The Women's 200 metre breaststroke competition of the 2014 FINA World Swimming Championships (25 m) will be held on 7 December.

Records
Prior to the competition, the existing world and championship records were as follows.

Results

Heats
The heats were held at 10:05.

Final
The final were held at 18:28.

References

Women's 200 metre breaststroke
2014 in women's swimming